Bukono is one of the five traditional principalities of the kingdom of Busoga in Uganda.

It was founded before 1656 and became a part of the British protectorate in Busoga in 1896. Its ruler is known as the Nkono.

References 

Busoga